Steven Carl Walske is an American philatelist and philatelic writer. He was appointed to the Roll of Distinguished Philatelists in 2017.

He once owned the unique block of four of the 1869 24c stamps of the United States with an inverted center.

Selected publications
 The Pony Express: A postal history. Philatelic Foundation, New York, 2005. (With Richard C. Frajola & George J. Kramer) 
 Special mail routes of the American Civil War: A guide to across-the-lines postal history. Confederate Stamp Alliance, United States, 2008. (With Scott R. Trepel)  
 Mails of the westward expansion: 1803 to 1861. Western Cover Society, United States, 2015. (With Richard C. Frajola)

References

Further reading

American philatelists
Living people
Signatories to the Roll of Distinguished Philatelists
Philatelic authors
Fellows of the Royal Philatelic Society London
Year of birth missing (living people)